Kylie may refer to:

Kylie (name), a female given name
Kylie Minogue (born 1968), Australian singer, often known simply as Kylie
Kylie Jenner (born 1997), television personality and cosmetics company executive

Music
Kylie (album), 1988 album by Minogue
Kylie Minogue (album), 1994 album by Minogue
Kylie and Garibay, musical duo including Minogue
"Kylie" (song), by Akcent

Other uses
Kylie, a type of non-returning boomerang

See also
Kylee (born 1994), an American-Japanese singer
Life of Kylie, an American reality television series